Klenak is a village in Serbia. It is situated in the Ruma municipality, in the Srem District, Vojvodina province. The village has a Serb ethnic majority and its population numbering 3,246 people (2002 census). The village also has its own football club FK Borac Klenak.

See also
List of places in Serbia
List of cities, towns and villages in Vojvodina

Populated places in Syrmia